Rusila Nagasau (born 4 August 1987) is a Fijian rugby union player. She plays rugby sevens for Fiji and was also a representative soccer player. She was included in the squad for the 2016 France Women's Sevens.

Biography 
Nagasau was instrumental in Fiji qualifying for the 2016 Olympics when she scored four tries in the 2015 Oceania Women's Sevens Championship final against Samoa. She was named in the sevens squad for the 2016 Summer Olympics alongside cousin and captain Ana Maria Roqica.

Nagasau represented Fiji at the 2020 Summer Olympics. She won a bronze medal at the event.

Nagasau was a batonbearer for the 2022 Commonwealth Games Queen's Baton Relay when the baton came to her island in February 2022. She was later a part of the Fijiana sevens team that won the silver medal at the 2022 Commonwealth Games in Birmingham. In September she captained the team at the Rugby World Cup Sevens in Cape Town.

Nagasau was named on the bench in the warm up match against Canada ahead of the World Cup. She was selected for the Fijiana squad to the 2021 Rugby World Cup in New Zealand.

References

External links

 
 

1987 births
Living people
Fijian female rugby union players
Olympic rugby sevens players of Fiji
Rugby sevens players at the 2016 Summer Olympics
Rugby sevens players at the 2020 Summer Olympics
Medalists at the 2020 Summer Olympics
Olympic bronze medalists for Fiji
Olympic medalists in rugby sevens
Fiji international women's rugby sevens players
Commonwealth Games silver medallists for Fiji
Commonwealth Games medallists in rugby sevens
Rugby sevens players at the 2022 Commonwealth Games
Medallists at the 2022 Commonwealth Games